Jowo Shakyamuni or Jowo Rinpoche (Wylie jo bo rin po che) is a large 7th century statue of Gautama Buddha, supposed to have been made in China, but of great influence on the tradition of Tibetan art. Together with Jowo Mikyö Dorje, it is one of the most sacred statues in Tibet. Jowo Rinpoche is housed in the Jokhang chapel of the Rasa Trulnang Tsuglakhang Temple, whereas the Jowo Mikyö Dorje is in the Ramoche temple, both in Lhasa.

History
The Jowo Rinpoche has a long history. According to Tibetan legend, the Buddha Shakyamuni requested the divine craftsman create a proxy of him destined eventually for Tibet. It came to be owned by the king of Magadha, who gave it to a Tang emperor of China. One of the emperor's clansman's daughters, Wenchen Kongjo, took it to Lhasa via Lhagang as part of her dowry when she become a foreign consort of the first Tibetan emperor Songtsen Gampo. During Mangsong Mangtsen's reign (649-676), because of a threat that the Tang Chinese might invade and steal the Jowo, Princess Wencheng is said to have hidden the Jowo Rinpoche in a secret chamber in the Tsuglakhang. A subsequent princess from China had it placed in the central chapel of the Jokhang, sometime after 710 CE. It was replaced at Ramoche by a statue of Jowo Mikyo Dorje, a small bronze statue of the Buddha when he was eight years old, crafted by Vishvakarman, and brought to Lhasa by the Nepalese queen, Bhrikuti. Jowo Mikyo Dorje was badly damaged by the Red Guards during the Cultural Revolution.

The Ramoche temple was gutted and partially destroyed in the 1960s and the bronze statue disappeared. In 1983 the lower part of it was said to have been found in a Lhasa rubbish heap, and the upper half in Beijing. They have now been joined and the statue is housed in the Ramoche Temple, which was partially restored in 1986, and still showed severe damage in 1993.

The restoration of the Jowo Mikyö Dorje was possible thanks to Ribur Rinpoche (1923–2006), a revered Lama who was jailed by the Chinese Army in 1959 for 20 years in Lhasa and was released in 1979 in connection with the liberalization politics of Deng Xiaoping. Ribur Rinpoche was granted a position at the Office of Religious Affairs of Tibet and began attempts to bring back spiritual sacred treasures that had been taken to China. In 1983, with the help of the 10th Panchen Lama, he succeeded in finding the upper part of Jowo Mikyö Dorje and returned it to Tibet. The Panchen Lama explained to the Chinese government how sacred the value of Jowos was for Tibetans and that their response to the quest of Ribur Rinpoche would help to prove the sincerity of the new Chinese religious policies.

References

Literature
Warner, Cameron David. 2008. "The Precious Lord: The History and Practice of the Cult of the Jowo Śākyamuni in Lhasa, Tibet." Ph.D. Dissertation, Department of Sanskrit and Indian Studies, Harvard University.
Warner, Cameron David. 2011. "Re/crowning the Jowo Śākyamuni: Texts, Photographs, and Memories." History of Religions 51 (1): 1-30.
Warner, Cameron David. 2011. "The Genesis of Tibet's First Buddha Images: An Annotated Translation from Three Editions of 'The Vase-shaped Pillar Testament (Bka' chems ka khol ma)'." Light of Wisdom 1 (1): 33–45.

Bronze Buddha statues
Tibetan Buddhist art and culture